Wigginton and Hopwas is a civil parish in the district of Lichfield, Staffordshire, England.  The parish contains 16 listed buildings that are recorded in the National Heritage List for England.  All the listed buildings are designated at Grade II, the lowest of the three grades, which is applied to "buildings of national importance and special interest".  The parish contains the villages of Wigginton and Hopwas and the surrounding countryside.  Most of the listed buildings are houses and farmhouses, and the other listed buildings include two churches, a former pumping station, a pump house, a war memorial and a milepost.


Buildings

References

Citations

Sources

Lichfield District
Lists of listed buildings in Staffordshire